Państwowa Wyższa Szkoła Teatralna  may refer to one of three state–funded institutions of higher education in Poland such as the:
 Aleksander Zelwerowicz State Theatre Academy (Państwowa Wyższa Szkoła Teatralna im. Aleksandra Zelwerowicza) located in Warsaw
 PWST Branch Faculty of Puppetry (Wydział Sztuki Lalkarskiej) located in Białystok
 Ludwik Solski Academy for the Dramatic Arts (Państwowa Wyższa Szkoła Teatralna im. Ludwika Solskiego) located in Kraków
 PWST Branch Faculty of Acting & Puppetry (Wydziały Aktorski i Lalkarski) located in Wrocław
 PWST Branch Faculty of Dance Theatre (Wydział Teatru Tańca) located in Bytom
 National Film School in Łódź (Państwowa Wyższa Szkoła Filmowa, Telewizyjna i Teatralna im. Leona Schillera) located in Łódź

See also
 List of universities in Poland

Universities and colleges in Poland